The Singapore national ice hockey team is the national ice hockey team of Singapore and an associate member of the International Ice Hockey Federation. They made their World Championship debut in 2022, and have also played in the Challenge Cup of Asia, a regional tournament for lower-tier hockey national teams in Asia.

Tournament record

World Championship
 2021 – Cancelled due to the COVID-19 pandemic
 2022 – 47th place
 2023 – 49th place

All-time record against other nations
As of 8 March 2022

References

External links

IIHF profile
National Teams of Ice Hockey

National ice hockey teams in Asia
Ice hockey